Lancashire hotpot is a stew originating in Lancashire in the North West of England. It consists of lamb or mutton and onion, topped with sliced potatoes  and slowly baked in a pot at a low heat.

History and etymology
In the 17th century the word "hotpot" referred not to a stew but to a hot drink – a mixture of ale and spirits, or sweetened spiced ale. An early use of the term to mean a meat stew was in The Liverpool Telegraph in 1836: "hashes, and fricassees, and second-hand Irish hot-pots"; and the Oxford English Dictionary (OED) cites the dish as being served in Liverpool (which was then in Lancashire) in 1842. The Oxford Companion to Food (OCF) cites Elizabeth Gaskell's 1854 novel North and South, depicting hot-pot as the most prized dish among cotton workers in a northern town.

The OED gives the etymology as "hot adj. + pot n.", and cites the analogous French term pot-au-feu. The OCF refers to earlier forms of the term: "hotchpotch" (a mixed dish, typically a meat and vegetable stew) and "hotchpot", from the medieval French hochepot. A Book of Cookrye (1591) gives a recipe for hodgepodge, using "neck of Mutton or a fat rump of Beef", cooked and served in a broth thickened with bread. The term "hotchpotch" for a stew continued into the 19th century: Mrs Beeton (1861) gives a recipe under that name for a beef and onion stew in beer.

Hotpot became associated with Lancashire. In the OCF the food historian Roy Shipperbottom writes:

Preparation
The recipe usually calls for a mix of mutton (nowadays more frequently lamb) and onions covered with sliced potato, and slowly baked in a pot containing stock or sometimes water. The traditional Lancashire hotpot dish is tall, round and straight sided, with a lid. Some early recipes add lamb kidneys or oysters to the dish; it is traditionally served with pickled red cabbage.

Notes, references and sources

Notes

References

Sources

See also

 Hodge-Podge
 Irish stew
 Nikujaga
 Pot roast
 Scotch broth
 Scouse
 Stovies

External links
 History of Lancashire Hotpot at Foods of England

British stews
Casserole dishes
Lamb dishes
Lancashire cuisine
English cuisine
Potato dishes